Edwin Russell may refer to:

Edwin Fairman Russell (1914–2001), American newspaper publisher
Edwin Russell (artist) (1939–2013), British sculptor
Edwin Russell Jackman (1894–1967), American agricultural expert
Edwin Wensley Russell (1830–1915), British artist